Satarial is a Russian metal band. According to some sources, Satarial are one of the icons of the Russian black metal scene.

History

The band was founded in 1989 by Andrey „Lord Seth” Shmelev. It was then called " A.M.S.G. " (Ad Maiorum Satan Glorium ) and in 1993 changed its name to Satarial.

Its music videos and concerts often feature references to Slavic themes such as pagan rituals, which has earned it criticism from the Christian establishment. The group has been highly critical of the Russian government led by Vladimir Putin, particularly after its invasion of Crimea in 2014, and has directly called the government fascist. Due to this the band has received a number of fines and eventually, a ban on performing in Russia. Coupled with a number of death threats the members received, in September 2021 the band has emigrated to Poland, where it is residing and performing in the Lower Silesian region.

Discography

 Ad Maiorum Satanás Glorium (1989) (Demo) 
 ...And the Flame Will Take the Temples of Christ (1996) 
 The Queen of the Elves' Land (1998) 
 LARM (2000) 
 Heidenlarm (2001) 
 Tanz MiT ... Tod ... (2005) 
 Latexxx (2006) (electronic project Seth & Satarial)
 Lunar Cross (2014)
 Blessed Brigit (2016)

Videography 

 Walpurgis Night (1998) (VHS)
 The Queen of the Elves' Land (1999) (VHS)
 Gothic Rush (2006) (DVD)

Video 

 The Queen of the Elves' Land (1999)
 Lover Of The Night (2001)
 Hure Tod (2005)
 Horned One (2014) 
 Manifest of paganism (2016)

Current members 

 Andrey „Lord Seth” Shmelev - Vocal, Guitar, Hardy-gardy,  Programming.
 Angelica Satarial -  Drums, Female Vocal, Analog Synthesizer, Piano
 Sept Satrial- Flute, Wind Instruments
 Lolita Satarial - Shamanic Tambourine, Norwegian Horn, DJing/turntablism, Ethnic Voice, Visual Art

Past members 

 Necromancer - Bass 
 Orius - Contrabass
 Usurplague - Bass 
 Orco - Bass
 Lepra - Drums 
 Orm - Flute 
 Vampirella - Flute
 Morana - Violín, Vocal female 
 Aldea - Violín 
 Juice - Vocal 
 Soul - Vocal female 
 Raven - Bass
 Demogorgon - Drums

References

External links
http://www.prog-sphere.com/interviews/satarial-interview/
http://www.metal-archives.com/bands/Satarial/5740
http://sickanddestroy.info/2016/07/21/interview-satarial/
http://www.paratmagazine.com/rozhovory/satarial/

Russian heavy metal musical groups
1989 establishments in Russia
Musical groups established in 1989
Soviet heavy metal musical groups